Sangeeta S Bahl (born 9th Feb. 1965 in Jammu) is an Indian woman hailing from the Indian union territory of Jammu and Kashmir who scaled the world's tallest mountain peak Mount Everest in May, 2018 and became the oldest Indian woman to have scaled the world's tallest peak (29,031.7 ft.), at the age of 53 years. She also became the first woman from Jammu and Kashmir to scale the mountain. In addition to this she is a former Miss India finalist from 1985.

Career
As per Sangeeta, the idea of mountaineering came to her from her husband in 2011. It was in 2011 that the professional thought about mountaineering came to her and she climbed Mt. Kilimanjaro (5895 M) with her husband. Two years later, Bahl climbed Mt. Elbrus (5642 M), Europe’s highest peak before becoming the third Indian woman climber to climb Mt. Vinson (4897 M) in Antarctica in 2014. One year later, she also scaled Mt. Aconcagua (6962 M), highest peak of South America.

She is the Founder, Director and Image Consultant of Impact Image Consultants, a Gurgaon based professional company specializing in Image Consultancy. Additionally, as a Keynote Speaker and Trainer, she specialises in Mentoring and Coaching individuals, and corporate staff as well.

Mount Everest climb 2018
Bahl's previous attempt to climb Everest in 2017 failed due to altitude sickness. She was with six other climbers who suffered from high-altitude sickness and had to be evacuated.

Climbing Details of the six peaks of  Seven Summits

Personal life
She was born in Jammu, the summer capital city of the state of Jammu and Kashmir. Her husband is Ankur Bahl and they have one son Aarnav Bahl.

See also
Indian summiters of Mount Everest - Year wise
List of Mount Everest summiters by number of times to the summit
List of Mount Everest records of India
List of Mount Everest records

References

External links
 Sangeeta Sindhi Bahl

Indian female mountain climbers
1965 births
Living people
Indian summiters of Mount Everest
People from Jammu
20th-century Indian women
20th-century Indian people